The orchid nothobranch (Nothobranchius eggersi) is a species of killifish in the family Nothobranchiidae. It is endemic to the lower basin of the Rufiji River in Tanzania.  Its natural habitat is temporary pools and swamps. This species is found in both a blue and red form. This species was described in 1982 by Lothar Seegers with the type biology given as the Rufiji River near Utete, Rufiji District of Pwani Region in Tanzania. The specific name honours Seegers companion on two expeditions, the German aquarist Gerd Eggers.

References

Links
 Nothobranchius eggersi on WildNothos

eggersi
Endemic freshwater fish of Tanzania
Fish described in 1982
Taxonomy articles created by Polbot
Taxa named by Lothar Seegers